Brian Edward McBride (born 1970 in Irving, Texas) is a musician best known as one half of the duo Stars of the Lid. He has also released two solo albums, When The Detail Lost Its Freedom and The Effective Disconnect on Kranky using his own name. McBride moved to Austin, Texas in 1990 where he met Adam Wiltzie, forming Stars of the Lid in the early 1990s. He also worked with the now defunct Pilot Ships.

He lives in Los Angeles with his cats ("Ead" and "Nadine", presumably named after the characters in Twin Peaks, of which he is a fan). He is an active member of the policy debate community. In 2009 Brian teamed up with musician Kenneth James Gibson to form the band Bell Gardens. Their first EP Hangups Need Company was released on their own imprint Failed Better in 2010. Southern Records released their first LP Full Sundown Assembly in 2012 and Rocket Girl released their second LP Slow Dawns For Lost Conclusions in 2014.

Life and work
Brian worked with Bill Shanahan. Brian is an artist/sign maker. During the summer he directs the University of Texas National Institute of Forensics (UTNIF) high school debate camp. He currently coaches policy debate at the University of Southern California.

Discography

Brian McBride
 When the Detail Lost Its Freedom (Kranky, 2005)
 The Effective Disconnect (Kranky, 2010)

Bell Gardens
 Hangups Need Company (Failed Better, 2010)
 Full Sundown Assembly (Southern Records, 2012)
 Slow Dawns for Lost Conclusions (Rocket Girl, 2014)

External links 
 Biography on Kranky

References 

1970 births
Living people
Musicians from Texas
People from Irving, Texas
Ambient musicians